Great War at Sea: U.S. Navy Plan Orange is a board wargame designed by Michael Bennighof and published by Avalanche Press in 1998. It is part of the Great War at Sea board game series.

Overview 
The game is based on United States Navy plans on a hypothetical naval battle between United States and Japan in 1930s.

Reception 
Great War at Sea: Plan Orange won the Origins Awards for Best Historical Board Game of 1998.

References

External links 

Origins Award winners
Naval board wargames
Tactical wargames
Avalanche Press games
Wargames introduced in the 1990s